redoubt may refer to :
 Redoubt, a physical fortification
 American Redoubt, a political migration movement
 Redoubt, a locality in the Mbizana Local Municipality in the Eastern Cape, South Africa
 Mount Redoubt (disambiguation)
 National redoubt, a defensive strategic concept